Jeffrey Jon Tabaka (born January 17, 1964) is an American former professional baseball player who pitched in the Major Leagues from 1994 to 2001.  

Tabaka graduated from Copley High School in Copley, Ohio and played collegiately at Kent State University from 1983-1986. He was drafted by the Montreal Expos in the second round of the 1986 amateur draft. In his six seasons in the major leagues he pitched for the Pittsburgh Pirates, San Diego Padres, Houston Astros, Cincinnati Reds, and St. Louis Cardinals.

External links

1964 births
Living people
Major League Baseball pitchers
Pittsburgh Pirates players
San Diego Padres players
Houston Astros players
Cincinnati Reds players
St. Louis Cardinals players
Nashville Sounds players
Kent State Golden Flashes baseball players
Baseball players from Ohio
Newark Bears players
People from Barberton, Ohio
Buffalo Bisons (minor league) players
Carolina Mudcats players
Clearwater Phillies players
Colorado Springs Sky Sox players
El Paso Diablos players
Indianapolis Indians players
Jacksonville Expos players
Jamestown Expos players
Las Vegas Stars (baseball) players
Memphis Redbirds players
New Orleans Zephyrs players
Reading Phillies players
Scranton/Wilkes-Barre Red Barons players
Stockton Ports players
Tucson Toros players
West Palm Beach Expos players
Mat-Su Miners players
Alaska Goldpanners of Fairbanks players